Stéphanie Dubois was the defending champion but she lost in the quarterfinals to Irina Falconi. Fourth seed Jelena Dokić from Australia defeated France's Virginie Razzano to claim the title.

Seeds

Draw

Finals

Top half

Bottom half

References
Vancouver Open Women's Draw

Odlum Brown Vancouver Open
Vancouver Open